Chastain may refer to:

 Chastain (surname)
 Chastain, Georgia, a community in the United States
 Chastain Park, located in the Atlanta, Georgia area
 Chastain Peak,  Thiel Mountains, Antarctica
 Chastain (band), an American heavy metal band
 Chastain Stone, an American rapper
 Chastain Motorsports, team in Indy Racing League
 Chastain Park Memorial Hospital, fictional setting of Fox TV series The Resident (TV series)